The 1916–17 Austrian First Class season was the sixth season of top-tier football in Austria. It was won by SK Rapid Wien who would finish two points ahead of second place Floridsdorfer AC.

League standings

Results

References
Austria - List of final tables (RSSSF)

Austrian Football Bundesliga seasons
Austria
1916–17 in Austrian football